Pavel Aquilinas (also Vorličný or Aquilinus) (before 1520 – c. 1569) was Czech Protestant theologian, pedagogist, humanistic poet and translator.

He is one of co-authors of the Moravian Confession.

Czech poets
Czech male poets
Czech Protestant clergy
Czech schoolteachers
Czech Renaissance humanists
Czech theologians
16th-century Bohemian people
16th-century Latin-language writers
Czech translators
16th-century translators
Translators from Latin
Translators to Czech
Writers from Hradec Králové
Czech people of the Moravian Church
16th-century Bohemian writers